PLADES (meaning "Labor Program to Development" as an acronym in Spanish) is an NGO from Peru. It is an institution formed by a multidisciplinary team of professionals specialized in Latin American labor problems. The institution promotes union organization strength and the social watch of labor standards recognized in the effective International Instruments, incorporating the perspective of gender equality and contributing the construction of a global model of fair and democratic development.

References

External links
 PLADES

Clubs and societies in Peru